Dugin (Russian: Дугин) is a Russian masculine surname originating from the word duga (a curve); its feminine counterpart is Dugina. It may refer to the following notable people:
 Aleksandr Dugin (born 1962) is a Russian political philosopher, analyst, and strategist
Darya Dugina (1992–2022), Russian journalist and political activist, daughter of Aleksandr
Dmitri Dugin (born 1968), Russian water polo player
Egor Dugin (born 1990), Russian ice hockey center

Russian-language surnames